Sebecidae is an extinct family of prehistoric terrestrial sebecosuchian crocodylomorphs. The oldest known member of the group is Ogresuchus furatus known from the Upper Cretaceous (Maastrichtian) Tremp Formation (Spain). Sebecids were diverse, abundant and broadly distributed in South America (mostly in Argentina, Brazil and Bolivia) during the Cenozoic, until the Middle Miocene; although it has been suggested that at least some forms could have survived until the Miocene-Pliocene boundary in Brazil.

This group included many medium- and large-sized genera, from Sebecus to a giant indeterminate unnamed species from the Miocene.

Phylogeny
The following cladogram simplified after Diego Pol and Jaime E. Powell (2011).

References

Neogene crocodylomorphs
Paleogene crocodylomorphs
Prehistoric reptiles of South America
 
Maastrichtian first appearances
Miocene extinctions
Prehistoric reptile families